The Djerassi Resident Artists Program is an artists and writers residency in Woodside, California. The residency sits on a 583-acre ranch with a 12-sided cattle barn converted into artist studios.

History 
The program was co-founded in 1979 by Carl Djerassi, the inventor of the birth control pill, and Diane Middlebrook. The residency is competitive and held at no cost to the artists. The location was a former cattle ranch. Originally a women-only residency program in honor of Djerassi's artist daughter Pamela, lost to suicide at 28 in 1978, the program later expanded to welcome all genders. 

This residency offers an annual open house event.

References

External links
 Official website

Woodside, California
Artist residencies
San Mateo County, California
Arts organizations based in the San Francisco Bay Area
American art
Artist colonies
1979 establishments in California
Artist's retreats